Daegu or Taegu may refer to:

Daegu, a metropolitan city in South Korea
Daegu International Airport
Battle of Taegu, an invasion and battle during the Korean War
Daegu Catholic University
Daegu FC

See also
Revised Romanization of Korean, for explanation of the two spellings